Princess Lan (蘭王妃, personal name unknown) was the wife of Murong Sheng (Emperor Zhaowu), an emperor of the Chinese/Xianbei state Later Yan, while he was an imperial prince.

Princess Lan was the daughter of Lan Han the Prince of Dunqiu and his wife Lady Yi. It is not known when she married Murong Sheng, but as of 398, she carried the title of princess, because Murong Sheng was the Prince of Changle under the reign of his father Murong Bao (Emperor Huimin). That year, after a rebellion secretly instigated by Lan Han, Murong Bao and Murong Sheng were forced to flee from the capital Longcheng (龍城, in modern Jinzhou, Liaoning). During that flight, Princess Lan was described to have carefully served her mother-in-law, Murong Bao's concubine Consort Ding. Later that year, Lan Han laid a trap for Murong Bao and tricked him into believing that he was still faithful to Murong Bao, and then as Murong Bao approached Longcheng, he had Murong Bao killed. He then took over the throne.

However, due to pleas from Princess Lan and Lady Yi, Lan Han did not execute Murong Sheng. Later that year, Murong Sheng overthrew Lan Han in a coup and restored Later Yan as its emperor. He considered executing Princess Lan, as the daughter of a traitor, but Consort Ding (then an empress dowager) interceded on her behalf, reasoning that Princess Lan was the one who protected both Murong Sheng and herself, and Princess Lan was spared. However, she would never be empress. Murong Sheng never created another person as empress during his reign, either, suggesting that he still considered Princess Lan as his wife. Murong Sheng was assassinated in 401, and no further historical reference was made to Princess Lan after that point.

Later Yan people
Sixteen Kingdoms nobility